AMBE can refer to:

 Ambe, in anatomy, is a superficial jutting out of a bone.
 Advanced Multi-Band Excitation, digital voice encoder